Jalapa Mazatec is a Mazatecan language. An estimate from 1990 suggested it was spoken by 15,000 people, one-third of whom are monolingual, in 13 villages in the vicinity of the town of San Felipe Jalapa de Díaz in the Tuxtepec District of the Mexican state of Oaxaca. A 2016 study, published in 2019, estimated the Mazatec dialects to have 220,000 speakers. Egland (1978) found 73% intelligibility with Huautla, the prestige variety of Mazatec. Literacy in Jalapa is taught alongside Spanish in local schools.

Grammar
Jalapa Mazatec root words are primarily monosyllabic, and the intricate inflectional system is largely subsyllablic (Silverman 1994).

Phonology
Jalapa Mazatec syllables are maximally CCGV. However, vowels distinguish several phonations, and like all Mazatec languages, Jalapa has tone.

Tone
Jalapa roots distinguish three tones, low , mid , and high . In morphologically complex situations, combinations of these may form short (or perhaps mid-length) vowels with contour tones:  have been recorded.

The simple tones are contrasted in  "work",  "puma",  "mould".

In much of the literature, these are written with the numerals 1 (low), 2 (mid), and 3 (high).

Jalapa utilizes whistled speech, where each simple or contour tone is given a whistle pulse.

Vowels
Phonations are modal voice, breathy voice, and creaky voice; all phonations may also occur with the five nasal vowels:

{| class="IPA wikitable" 
|+Jalapa Mazatec vowels
|-
!Modal voice
| i  ||  æ  ||  a  ||  o  ||  u 
|-align=center
!Breathy voice
| i̤ || æ̤ || a̤ || o̤ || ṳ
|-align=center
!Creaky voice
| ḭ || æ̰ || a̰ || o̰ || ṵ
|-align=center
!Modal nasal 
| ĩ || æ̃ || ã || õ || ũ
|-align=center
!Breathy nasal
| ĩ̤ || æ̤̃ || ã̤ || õ̤ || ṳ̃
|-align=center
!Creaky nasal
| ḭ̃ || æ̰̃ || ã̰ || õ̰ || ṵ̃
|}

Breathy vowels may have strong breathy voicing throughout their length.

Jalapa is unique among the Mazatec languages in distinguishing breathy vowels. These arose through the contraction of Proto-Mazatecan disyllables of the form CVhV, where C was voiced and the two vowels were the same. When the two syllables carried different tones, these contracted into a contour. For example, proto-Mazatec  "stone" became  (through a presumed intermediate );  "thief" became ; and  "your soap" became . Similar contractions occurred with CVʔV disyllables to produce creaky vowels, but creaky vowels already existed in the proto-language.

Jalapa also has a phonemic distinction of unclear nature that has been suggested to be "ballisticity". However, it lacks the characteristics of ballistic syllables in other Otomanguean languages. The only consistent distinction Silverman et al. (1994) were able to measure was one of vowel length, with vowels of the alleged ballistic syllables being two-thirds the length of the vowels of the productive open class of nouns, with a slight increase in pitch. They may reflect the original short vowels of proto-Mazatec, as opposed to the vowels of morphologically complex monosyllabic nouns of modern Jalapa Mazatec. If so, Jalapa would have a three-way length distinction, as doubly long vowels are also found in morphologically complex situations. Note that this distinction is not marked in this article apart from this one table:

Consonants
Jalapa consonants distinguish (prenasalized) voiced, tenuis, and aspirated plosives, as well as voiceless, voiced, and glottalized sonorants.

There is also a flap, which only occurs in one morpheme, the clitic = "probably".

The labial velars  become bilabial  before front vowels:  "it is finished" vs.  "John", etc. In the same position, the stop  is realized as a heterorganic velar-bilabial affricate [kɸ].

Phonetically aspirated fricatives do not occur before creaky vowels, while aspirated stops do. Therefore, Silverman et al. (1994) treats them as fricative-/h/ clusters.

Silverman (1994:126) remarks that voiced stops are prenasalized in intervocalic position, but later on the same page states that they are prenasalized in initial position. With voiced plosives, the nasalization is two-thirds the duration of the consonant. It is not clear if they ever appear without prenasalization.

Voiceless nasals are voiced for the last quarter of their duration.

Glottalized sonorants are variable in their production. The may occur as a glottal stop followed by a modally voiced sonorant, etc.; an initially creaky voiced sonorant switching to modal voice by the end; a fully creaky consonant; or the creak may extend into the following vowel.

Phonotactics
Aspirated consonants do not occur before breathy vowels, and glottalized consonants only occur before modally voiced vowels. Nasal consonants only occur before nasal vowels. Voiced plosives are prenasalized in intervocalic position.

Consonant clusters include NC, where N is a nasal and C is a voiceless plosive or affricate, and SC, where S is a sibilant and C is a tenuis plosive or affricate.

References

Sources

Mazatecan languages

pms:Lenga mazatec, chiquihuitlán